"Deja Vu" (stylized in all lowercase) is a song by American singer-songwriter Olivia Rodrigo. It was released on April 1, 2021, as the second single from her debut studio album Sour (2021), through Geffen and Interscope Records. Rodrigo wrote the song with its producer Dan Nigro, with Taylor Swift, Jack Antonoff, and St. Vincent receiving writing credits for its interpolation of Swift's 2019 song "Cruel Summer". An incorporation of various pop sub-genres, "Deja Vu" is about heartbreak and explores Rodrigo's anguish about her ex-partner repeating things they did in his new relationship.

"Deja Vu" received acclaim from music critics, many of whom considered it a strong follow-up to "Drivers License" (2021) and praised its lyrics. In the United States, the song debuted at number eight on the Billboard Hot 100 and made Rodrigo the first artist to debut their first two singles in the chart's top 10. It eventually peaked at number three. "Deja Vu" reached the top 10 in Ireland, Australia, Malaysia, New Zealand, Singapore, Canada, Latvia, the United Kingdom, Portugal, and the Czech Republic.

Allie Avital directed the music video for "Deja Vu", filmed in Malibu, California, which depicts Rodrigo observing her ex-boyfriend mimic their relationship with his new love interest, played by Talia Ryder. Rodrigo performed the song on shows such as MTV Push and Billboard Women in Music, and included it on the set lists for her 2022 Sour concert tour and the Glastonbury Festival.

Background

Olivia Rodrigo began meeting with record labels in early 2020, and subsequently signed with Geffen Records and Interscope Records, intending to release her debut extended play in 2021. American songwriter and producer Dan Nigro encountered a video of her performing her then-unreleased song "Happier" and was impressed by her vocals, stating, "her voice is insane". He contacted Rodrigo suggesting they make music together. Their plans were initially delayed due to the onset of the COVID-19 pandemic, but the two began working on music at Nigro's home studio a few months later. Rodrigo and Nigro co-wrote the song "Drivers License" in July 2020, which she released as her debut single in January 2021, to unprecedented commercial success. Billboard declared it one of the "most dominant" hits in Hot 100 history.

Rodrigo and Nigro wrote "Deja Vu" within one day in August 2020, a month after "Drivers License" was written. The song was inspired by a lyric idea she had stored in the notes application on her phone: "When she was with you do you get deja vu?". Rodrigo elaborated on its concept: "I get déjà vu all the time. So I thought it would be a cool play on words to use déjà vu as a metaphor for this very universal thing that happens when you break up with someone and they get with somebody else, and see them living the life that you lived". The recording of "Deja Vu" went on over several months as she rerecorded her vocals and brainstormed new melodies. The song's bridge was influenced by Taylor Swift's 2019 song "Cruel Summer". Rodrigo and Nigro considered introducing electronic dance music-influenced vocal chops into its post-chorus, but opted for a synthesizer riff instead as Rodrigo thought the former were "too poppy".

Rodrigo began hinting the release of a new song by deleting posts from her Instagram account and sharing cryptic teasers of it in late March 2021. On March 29, she revealed its title, "Deja Vu", artwork, and release date. Rodrigo chose "Deja Vu" as her second single as she considered it a "natural progression" from "Drivers License", displaying her versatility as an artist: "I can make heartbreak songs but I can also make cool alternative pop songs. I didn't want to be pigeonholed into the 'heartbreak ballad girl' thing." She posted three clips preceding the announcement, featuring a melting ice cream cone, drifting clouds, and a car being driven along the ocean. In an interview with MTV News, Rodrigo stated that the song was "definitely not like 'Drivers License' at all", and was excited and nervous about her audience viewing a different aspect of her artistry on it. Geffen Records released it for digital download and streaming on April 1, 2021, as the second single from her debut studio album Sour (2021). Interscope Records sent "Deja Vu" to contemporary hit radio stations in the United States five days later, and for radio airplay in Italy on April 23. In July 2021, Swift, Jack Antonoff, and St. Vincent, the writers of "Cruel Summer", received writing credits on "Deja Vu" for its interpolation of the former. This followed Swift and Antonoff previously being credited on Sours fourth track "1 Step Forward, 3 Steps Back" for interpolating their 2017 song "New Year's Day", and preceded the members of Paramore receiving credits on "Good 4 U" (2021).

Composition
"Deja Vu" is 3 minutes and 35 seconds long. Nigro produced and recorded the song at Amusement Studios in Los Angeles. He handled drum programming, and plays the acoustic guitar, electric guitar, Wurlitzer, bass, Juno 60, and percussion, Jam City plays the organ and guitar, and Ryan Linvill plays the flute and saxophone. Sterling Laws recorded the drum at Heavy Duty Studios in Burbank, and Chris Kaych and Jasmine Chen handled drum engineering. Mitch McCarthy mixed it at SOTA Studios in Los Angeles and Randy Merrill mastered it at Sterling Sound in New York City.

"Deja Vu" is a midtempo psychedelic pop, pop rock, art pop, and indie pop song, with influences of alternative music. The song is set over a piano instrumental, complemented by distorted guitars and heavy drums after the pre-chorus. It also includes buoyant synths. "Deja Vu" has a sensitive beat that crests into an expansive bridge according to Entertainment Weeklys Marcus Jones. Rodrigo delivers harmonious vocals over the song's chimes and faded electronics; The Observers Michael Cragg thought its whispered vocals recalled Lorde. The song's similarity with "Cruel Summer" occurs during the bridge, where she emulates the "angry-chanty thing" from Swift's newer songs according to Varietys Chris Willman. Bobby Olivier of Spin thought that with the "attention [it] paid to quotable and cresting bridges", both songs concluded on a similar note, and The Guardians Rachel Aroesti described "Deja Vu" as a "Taylor Swiftian" pop song.

"Deja Vu" has lyrics about heartbreak. Throughout the song, Rodrigo addresses a past partner who is currently pursuing a different relationship and recalls how they are repeating things he did with Rodrigo, like driving up the California coast, eating strawberry ice cream, trading jackets, watching reruns of Glee, and listening to Billy Joel's 1983 single "Uptown Girl". She expresses anguish about him recycling jokes she told. Over its hook, Rodrigo sarcastically wonders if he ever accidentally addresses his new girlfriend by her name. By the conclusion of "Deja Vu", she begins contemplating that the experiences she shared with him, perhaps, were not original to begin with: "I hate to think that I was just your type." Entertainment Weeklys Maura Johnston described the song as "a gauzy fantasia with a time-blackened heart" and a "venom-filled diatribe toward an ex who's moved on". Writing for The New York Times, Jon Caramanica identified its lyrics as "plain and pinpoint pained", and the "power struggle over who taught who about cool music" as an element reminiscent of Swift as well.

Critical reception
"Deja Vu" received acclaim from music critics, many of whom perceived it as a strong follow-up to "Drivers License". Stereogums Tom Breihan commended the song's stylistic change of pace from Rodrigo's debut single, describing it as a "giddy, stomping pop banger with a euphoric-singalong chorus", although he also noted their similar subject matter. Tatiana Tenreyro of The A.V. Club lauded it as an improvement, stating that it was a remarkable and sparkling track that "feels like a marriage between Taylor Swift and Radiohead". Writing for NME, Rhian Daly called "Deja Vu" an illustrious follow-up, and Rolling Stones Angie Martoccio and Chicago Tribune thought it dispelled any notion that she was going to be a one-hit wonder.

Quinn Moreland of Pitchfork stated that with "Deja Vu", Rodrigo proved to be "pop music's next heavyweight", complimenting its gratifyingly enmeshing production, and deemed it an audacious and poignant catharsis. Cragg described the song as an outstanding and lyrically sharp "kiss-off", and writing for Exclaim!, Heather Taylor-Singh opined that it is mesmerizing and "displays the nuances of young love". Pitchforks Olivia Horn wrote that she uses her emotional turbulence like jet fuel on it and praised its specific lyrics. Caramanica thought Rodrigo captured the torment of collapse, and the apprehension of watching your old partner reassemble. Craig Jenkins of New York thought "Deja Vu" worthy of immediately being placed in a "hall of fame". Writing for DIY, Jenessa Williams called "Deja Vu" the "perfect bedfellow to Conan Gray's 'Heather'", and described it as a "'don't know what you're missing' fantasy that thrives under [thick] drums and [hurtingly] relatable snark". AllMusic's Heather Phares viewed "shades of Alanis Morissette's jagged, jilted younger woman in [the song's] hyper-literate litany of tarnished memories".

Some publications included "Deja Vu" in their list of the 100 best songs of 2021. Rob Sheffield placed the song at number two, and deemed it the finest and most underrated among Rodrigo's successful releases that year, establishing her as the "pop savant of the moment". He was highly enthusiastic about its "Uptown Girl" reference: "It's a perfect ride on the pop time machine". Pitchfork included "Deja Vu" at number 10, and Jenn Pelly stated that despite the chart success of "Drivers License", "Deja Vu" heralded Rodrigo's emergence as an artist. She noted her earnest umbrage over her ex and his partner's trivial activities, and declared that "in the drama of [the song,] Olivia is directing". NPR listed it at number 20, and Lyndsey McKenna stated that despite the interpolation, "the track is all Rodrigo: a sharp send-off of an earworm, somehow delivered with both irreverent playfulness and brute force".

Commercial performance 
"Deja Vu" debuted at number eight on the US Billboard Hot 100 issued for April 17, 2021, making Rodrigo the first artist to debut their first two singles in the chart's top 10. Upon Sours release, the song peaked at number three on the chart issued for June 5, 2021, and received a 4× Platinum certification from the Recording Industry Association of America. On the Canadian Hot 100, it charted at number four, and Music Canada certified it 3× Platinum. "Deja Vu" reached number four in the United Kingdom, and earned a Platinum certification from the British Phonographic Industry.

In Australia, "Deja Vu" peaked at number three, and the Australian Recording Industry Association certified it 3× Platinum. The song appeared at number 33 on the Triple J Hottest 100, 2021, alongside four other songs from Sour. It charted at number three in New Zealand, and received a Platinum certification from Recorded Music NZ. "Deja Vu" reached the top 20 of national record charts, at number two in Ireland; number three in Malaysia and Singapore; number four in Latvia; number five in Portugal; number 10 in the Czech Republic; number 11 in South Africa; number 15 in India; number 17 in Lebanon, Lithuania, and Norway; and number 19 in Greece, Hungary, and Slovakia. The song earned a Platinum certification in Norway, Portugal, and Poland; and Gold in Denmark, Italy, and Sweden.

Music video

Allie Avital directed the music video for "Deja Vu", which was released on April 1, 2021. Talia Ryder makes a cameo in it. 

In the video, Rodrigo drives up the Pacific Coast Highway in a headscarf reminiscent of those worn by actresses in Alfred Hitchcock's movies. She reaches home and tries on the same green gown as Ryder, and faces the latter's reflection in the mirror. Rodrigo realizes the similarities between her ex-partner's former relationship with her and his present one with Ryder. She initially tries to be happy for her and smiles, but eventually gets angry and breaks television sets with a sledgehammer. According to Peoples Darlene Aderoju, it depicts "the emotional journey that a heartbroken lover experiences when their ex officially moves on with someone else".

Live performances
Rodrigo's performance of "Deja Vu" for MTV Push was published online on May 1, 2021. She reprised the song during her Tiny Desk Concert in a department of motor vehicles in December 2021. Rodrigo sang it in a pink dress for Billboard Women in Music on March 2, 2022. She was accompanied by a four-piece, all-female band in all-white outfits during the pre-filmed performance. Billboards Andrew Unterberger remarked that Rodrigo displayed typically vulnerable intimacy and bluntness and offered an alternately pleasant and grimy rendition. She included "Deja Vu" in the set list for her 2022 Sour concert tour. Rodrigo performed the song at the Glastonbury Festival 2022. She introduced it by saying "I just wanted to ask you guys a question, does anyone here ever get deja vu?", which The Guardians Laura Snapes thought highlighted the cacophony between her more impromptu and planned moments during the show. Rodrigo reprised "Deja Vu" as a duet, with Billy Joel on piano, during one of the latter's Billy Joel in Concert shows, followed by "Uptown Girl".

Credits and personnel
Credits adapted from the liner notes of Sour and Tidal.

Studio locations

 Recorded at Amusement Studios (Los Angeles)
 Drums recorded at Heavy Duty Studios (Burbank)
 Mixed at SOTA Studios (Los Angeles)
 Mastered at Sterling Sound (New York City)

Personnel

 Olivia Rodrigo – vocals, backing vocals, songwriting
 Daniel Nigro – songwriting, production, recording, acoustic guitar, electric guitar, Wurlitzer, bass, drum programming, Juno 60, backing vocals, percussion
 Taylor Swift – songwriting, interpolation
 Jack Antonoff – songwriting, interpolation
 Annie Clark – songwriting, interpolation
 Dan Viafore – assistant engineering
 Jam City – organ, guitar
 Ryan Linvill – flute, saxophone
 Sterling Laws – drum recording
 Chis Kaych – drum engineering
 Jasmine Chen – drum engineering
 Mitch McCarthy – mixing
 Randy Merrill – mastering

Charts

Weekly charts

Year-end charts

Certifications

Release history

References

2021 singles
2021 songs
Geffen Records singles
Interscope Records singles
Olivia Rodrigo songs
Psychedelic pop songs
Songs written by Olivia Rodrigo
Songs written by Dan Nigro
Songs written by Taylor Swift
Songs written by Jack Antonoff
Songs written by St. Vincent (musician)
Song recordings produced by Dan Nigro
Songs about jealousy
Art pop songs
Indie pop songs